VSP may refer to:

 V. S. Pritchett (1900–1997), author
 Valley State Prison in Chowchilla, California
 Vehicle Sound for Pedestrians, a noise warning system for electric vehicles developed by Nissan
 Vehicle-specific power, a formalism used in the evaluation of vehicle emissions
 Vermont State Police
 Vertical seismic profile (geophysics)
 Very Serious People, a phrase referring to commentators who retain a respectable reputation despite being consistently wrong about everything, popularized by Paul Krugman
 Victoria Socialist Party, of Australia
 Videsha Seva Padakkama, a military decoration in Sri Lanka
 Virginia State Police
 Virtual Storage Platform, from Hitachi Data Systems
 Virtuoso Server Pages; see Virtuoso Universal Server
 Visakhapatnam Steel Plant
 Vision Service Plan, a vision insurance company
 VoIP, service provider
 Voith Schneider Propeller, a marine propulsion system
 Voitures sans permis, low-speed vehicles not requiring a driving licence to operate in France
 Voltage Sensitive Phosphatase, a family of voltage-regulated proteins